Richard Marner (born Alexander Pavlovich Molchanov, ; 27 March 192118 March 2004) was a Russian-British actor. He was probably best known for his role as Colonel Kurt von Strohm in the British sitcom 'Allo 'Allo!.

Early life 
Born in Petrograd, Russian SFSR, Molchanov (nicknamed "Sasha" by his family) was the eldest son of Colonel Pavel Molchanov, of the Semyonovsky Regiment, one of two that were set up for children of children who had played with Peter the Great of Russia. In 1924, his entire family left the Soviet Union and went to Finland and then Germany, before ending up in Britain and London, where Alexander's grandmother, author Olga Novikov (known in the family as "Babushka London") lived in Harley Street.

After being educated at Monmouth School in Wales, Molchanov became an assistant to the Russian tenor Vladimir Rosing, where he performed at Covent Garden. During World War II he joined the RAF, and was posted to South Africa with the Air Training Corps. After being invalided out, he changed his name to Richard Marner and began his long successful career as a stage and film actor.

Career 
One of Marner's early stage roles – as Dracula, with Howard Dean – is still regarded by some as the definitive interpretation of the role. In 1967, well before his role as the German Colonel in 'Allo 'Allo Marner played the minor and uncredited role of a German sentry in the classic war film The Dirty Dozen. His other films include Ice Cold in Alex, The One That Got Away, The Password Is Courage, You Only Live Twice, The Boys from Brazil, The Spy Who Came in from the Cold, The African Queen and the Swiss film Four in a Jeep, in which he did all the Russian dialogue. He was also in the television movie Birth of the Beatles, as Bruno Koschmider.

Marner's best known role was in 'Allo 'Allo! as German Commandant Colonel Kurt Von Strohm. He appeared in all nine series of the programme between 1984 and 1992. He also appears in an episode of Secret Army, the programme that 'Allo 'Allo parodies.

His other work included roles in The Protectors (1973), Mackenzie (1980), Triangle (1981), Lovejoy (1994), and the film The Sum of All Fears (as the Russian president).

Marner starred as a disgruntled father in the Gorbachev Pizza Hut commercial, starring the last leader of the Soviet Union, Mikhail Gorbachev.

In 1991, when the President of Russia, Boris Yeltsin, convened a "Congress of Compatriots" (an olive branch to some of the post-1917 White Russian diaspora), Marner was one of the 600 people who returned to the motherland. Despite being caught up in a coup, he stayed long enough to watch, through tearful eyes, the raising of the first Imperial Russian flag flown in Moscow since 1917.

Personal life 
Marner died nine days before his 83rd birthday on 18 March 2004 in Perth, Scotland, and left a wife, actress Pauline Farr, who retained Molchanoff as her off-stage name. Marner was fluent in Russian, English, French and German. He is survived by a daughter and three grandchildren.

Selected filmography 

 Highly Dangerous (1950) – Soldier on Train (uncredited)
 Lilli Marlene (1951) – SS Colonel
 Appointment with Venus (1951) – 2nd German Corporal
 The African Queen (1951) – Second Officer of Fort Shona
 Top Secret (1952) – Russian Sentry
 Never Let Me Go (1953) – Toasting Russian Officer (uncredited)
 Park Plaza 605 (1953) – Barkov
 Mask of Dust (1954) – Hans Brecht – racer
 Oh... Rosalinda!! (1955) – Col. Lebotov
 The Master Plan (1955) – Man (uncredited)
 The Man Who Knew Too Much (1956) – Aide to Prime Minister (uncredited)
 Reach for the Sky (1956) – German Officer in Staff Car (uncredited)
 Ill Met by Moonlight (1957) – German Officer with Gen. Brauer (uncredited)
 Miracle in Soho (1957) – Karl
 The One That Got Away (1957) – German Prisoner
 The Safecracker (1958) – German N.C.O
 No Time to Die (1958) – German colonel
 Ice Cold in Alex (1958) – German Guard
 The Inn of the Sixth Happiness (1958) – Russian Soldier (uncredited)
 The Square Peg (1958) – Hauptmann Schmidt (uncredited)
 A Touch of Larceny (1959) – Russian Officer Cornered by Max Easton (uncredited)
 Beyond the Curtain (1960) – Russian Officer (uncredited)
 A Circle of Deception (1960) – German colonel
 Very Important Person (1961) – German Guard (uncredited)
 Invasion Quartet (1961) – German Soldier (uncredited)
 The Pursuers (1961) – Aranson
 The Password Is Courage (1962) – Schmidt
 The Mouse on the Moon (1963) – Russian Air Force General
 Children of the Damned (1964) – Russian Embassy official (uncredited)
 Ring of Spies (1964) – Colonel Monat (uncredited)
 Operation Crossbow (1965) – SS Sergeant (uncredited)
 The Spy Who Came in from the Cold (1965) – Vopo Captain
 Where the Spies Are (1966) – Josef
 You Only Live Twice (1967) – Russian Controller (uncredited)
 The Dirty Dozen (1967) – German Sentry at Chateau (uncredited)
 Isadora (1968) – (uncredited)
 Le silencieux (1973)
 Tiffany Jones (1973) – Vorjak
 QB VII (1974) – Wladislaw Kranz
 The Internecine Project (1974) – German delegate
 The Girl from Petrovka (1974) – Kremlin Press Official
 Not Now, Comrade (1976) – Russian
 The Boys from Brazil (1978) – Emil Doring
 Avalanche Express (1979) – Field Marshal Prachko
 Birth of the Beatles (1979) – Club Boss
 The Last Horror Film (1982) – Screening Room Jury
 Nutcracker (1983) – Popov
 Pandora's Clock (1996)
 The Sum of All Fears (2002) – President Zorkin (final film role)

References

External links 

1921 births
2004 deaths
Male actors from Saint Petersburg
Soviet emigrants to the United Kingdom

British male film actors
British male stage actors
British male television actors
People educated at Monmouth School for Boys
Royal Air Force personnel of World War II
Emigrants from the Russian Empire to the United Kingdom
Royal Air Force airmen
British male comedy actors